The 1984 Australian Open was a tennis tournament played on grass courts at the Kooyong Lawn Tennis Club in Melbourne in Victoria in Australia. Held from 26 November through 9 December 1984, it was the 73rd edition of the Australian Open. American Chris Evert became the first tennis player in the open era to win 1,000 matches during this fortnight, ending the tournament with the women's title and a match winning record of 1,003 – 97. Sweden's Mats Willander won the men's single title, successfully defending his 1983 Australian Open championship picking up his third Grand Slam title.

Seniors

Men's singles

 Mats Wilander defeated  Kevin Curren 6–7(5–7), 6–4, 7–6(7–3), 6–2
 It was Wilander's 3rd career Grand Slam title and his 2nd Australian Open title.

Women's singles

 Chris Evert defeated  Helena Suková 6–7(4–7), 6–1, 6–3
 It was Evert's 16th career Grand Slam title and her 2nd and last Australian Open title.
 Helena Suková ended Martina Navratilova's streak after winning 6 majors in a row and stopped Navratilova 2 matches short of winning the Grand Slam.

Men's doubles

 Mark Edmondson /  Sherwood Stewart defeated  Joakim Nyström /  Mats Wilander 6–2, 6–2, 7–5
 It was Edmondson's 5th career Grand Slam title and his 5th and last Australian Open title. It was Stewart's 3rd career Grand Slam title and his 1st Australian Open title.

Women's doubles

 Martina Navratilova /  Pam Shriver defeated  Claudia Kohde-Kilsch /  Helena Suková 6–3, 6–4
 It was Navratilova's 30th career Grand Slam title and her 6th Australian Open title. It was Shriver's 10th career Grand Slam title and her 3rd Australian Open title. With this victory Navratilova and Shriver completed the first doubles Grand Slam in a calendar year in the Open Era, a feat not matched until Martina Hingis completed the same Grand Slam with two partners in 1998.

Mixed doubles
The competition was not held between 1970 and 1986.

Juniors

Boys' singles
 Mark Kratzmann defeated  Patrick Flynn 6–4, 6–1

Girls' singles
 Annabel Croft defeated  Helena Dahlström 6–0, 6–1

Boys' doubles
 Mike Baroch /  Mark Kratzmann defeated  Brett Custer /  David Macpherson 6–2, 5–7, 7–5

Girls' doubles
 Louise Field /  Larisa Savchenko defeated  Jackie Masters /  Michelle Parun 7–6, 6–2

References

External links
 Official website Australian Open

 
 

 
1984 in Australian tennis
November 1984 sports events in Australia
December 1984 sports events in Australia
1984,Australian Open